New Mexico United U23 is a development soccer team under the parent club New Mexico United based in Albuquerque, New Mexico. The team will compete in the Mountain Division of the Western Conference of USL League Two, the fourth tier of the American soccer pyramid.

History 
On January 23, 2020, New Mexico United announced the creation of a reserve team which would have begun play in the 2020 season. However, the USL League Two season was cancelled on April 30, 2020, due to the COVID-19 pandemic. The U23 team will bridge the gap between the High Performance Youth Program and the first team.

On April 16, 2022, New Mexico United U-23 announced their participation in the 2022 USL League Two season with Luke Sanford, the director of the youth academy, as head manager. Home matches are to be held throughout the state in the cities of Albuquerque, Roswell, Santa Fe, Taos, Gallup, and Farmington. The club has announced plans to play in more New Mexico cities in future seasons.

Sponsorship

Players and staff

Current roster

Note: Flags indicate national team as defined under FIFA eligibility rules. Players may hold more than one non-FIFA nationality.

Technical staff
{| class="wikitable sortable"
|-
! style="background:#000; color:#fcf000; border:2px solid #fcf000;" scope="col"|Title
! style="background:#000; color:#fcf000; border:2px solid #fcf000;" scope="col"|Name
|-

Year-by-year

References 

New Mexico United